WDWS (1400 AM) is a commercial radio station in Champaign, Illinois, calling itself "Newstalk Radio 1400 & 93.9FM DWS."  It airs a News/Talk radio format and is owned by The News-Gazette, the primary daily newspaper in the Champaign-Urbana Metropolitan Area.  The radio studios and offices are at the newspaper's headquarters on Fox Drive in Champaign.

WDWS is powered at 1,000 watts using a non-directional antenna.  The transmitter is on South Neil Street (U.S. Route 45) at West Windsor Road.  WDWS provides at least secondary coverage to much of east-central Illinois due to the area's excellent ground conductivity. Its grade B signal reaches as far as Bloomington-Normal and Decatur.  Programming is also heard on 250-watt FM translator W230CW at 93.9 MHz.

Programming
WDWS airs a mix of local news, talk, agricultural reports and sports shows along with nationally syndicated programs.  A local morning drive time show is hosted by Dave Gentry.  National hosts include Sean Hannity, Dave Ramsey,  Kim Komando, Jim Bohannon and Bill Cunningham.  Most hours begin with world and national news from CBS Radio News.

WDWS and sister station WHMS-FM are the flagship stations for University of Illinois Fighting Illini football and basketball.  WDWS also carries Fox Sports Radio programs on weekends.

History
It was the area's first commercial radio station. (WILL 580 AM, the non-commercial radio station of the University of Illinois, dates its start to the 1920s.)  

David W. Stevick, publisher of the News-Gazette, had applied for a license in 1935, and his wife Helen and daughter Marajen continued the project.  They named the station WDWS in his honor.  In 1937, WDWS became a CBS Radio Network affiliate.  It carried CBS's line up of dramas, comedies, news, sports, soap operas, game shows and big band broadcasts during the "Golden Age of Radio."

In 1949, WDWS added an FM station at 97.5 MHz.  For most of its early years, WDWS-FM simulcast the programming of WDWS 1400.  In 1988 it switched its call sign to WHMS-FM to establish a separate identity.

The two stations are the flagship stations for Illinois Fighting Illini football and basketball games, a role that WDWS has held throughout its history. Longtime sports director Jim Turpin also doubled as the radio voice of the Illini from 1960 until 2002.  WDWS also airs the Illini women's basketball, volleyball, and baseball games exclusively.   

WDWS was the east central Illinois network affiliate for the St. Louis Cardinals baseball broadcasts from when it signed on until 2010. WDWS broadcast the Chicago Cubs in 2011, however Cubs games moved to WGKC in 2012.

WDWS has been a CBS Radio affiliate for its entire history, except for a period from 2001 to 2009 when it was affiliated with ABC News Radio.  The station carried The Rush Limbaugh Show from 1997 until his death in 2021.  Sean Hannity was added in 2009.

WDWS's morning program was originally called "Penny for Your Thoughts." The show, formerly hosted by Jim Turpin and later by Brian Barnhart, was known for its unique open-line format.

In October 2021, WDWS began broadcasting a simulcast on FM translator W230CW at 93.9 MHz and rebranded itself as Newstalk Radio 1400 & 93.9FM DWS.

Notable staff
 Robert Goralski
 Larry Stewart
 Dave Gentry
 Greg Soulje
 Brian Barnhart
 Dave Loane
 Steve Kelly

References

External links

DWS
Radio stations established in 1937
Champaign, Illinois